Mario Schiano (20 July 1933 in Naples – 10 May 2008 in Rome) was an Italian alto saxophonist and soprano saxophonist associated with avant-garde/free jazz.

He was born in Naples. A member of the Italian Instabile Orchestra, Schiano recorded with musicians such as Famoudou Don Moye, Eugenio Colombo, Ernst Reijseger, Paul Rutherford, Gianluigi Trovesi and Joëlle Léandre, among others.

He died in Rome in 2008.

Discography
 Sud (1973)
 On the Waiting List (1973)
 De Dé (1977)
 Out of Date (1984)
 Redland Blue (1988)
 Benefit Concert to Repurchase the Pendulum for Mr. Foucault (1989)
 Unlike (1990)
 Uncaged (1991, with Don Moye)
 And So On (1992, with Ernst Reijseger
 Original Sins: Unreleased, 1967–1970 (1992)
 Tracks (1993)
 Blue Memories (with Joëlle Léandre)
 Meetings (1994)
 She Was Sitting in the First Row (1994)
 Used to Be Friends (1995)
 Social Security  (Live, 1996)
 Friendship of Walnuts (1996)
 (To Be Continued...) (1998)
 Trio di Napoli (1998)
 Fluxus: Instant Soundtrack for a Silent Movie (1999)
 My Funny Valentine (1999, Vocals)
 Supposing That (2002)
 Mario Schiano & His All Stars (2007)

As contributor

 w/ Elio Martusciello and Maurizio Martuscielo

References

1933 births
2008 deaths
Musicians from Naples
Italian jazz saxophonists
Male saxophonists
Jazz alto saxophonists
Jazz soprano saxophonists
Free jazz saxophonists
Avant-garde jazz saxophonists
20th-century Italian musicians
20th-century saxophonists
20th-century Italian male musicians
Male jazz musicians
Italian Instabile Orchestra members